Jonathan Reed. better known by his stage name Foxx, is a rapper and songwriter from Baton Rouge, Louisiana. His debut album, Street Gossip (Foxx album), was released on September 18, 2007.

Discography

Studio albums

Collaboration albums

Mixtapes

Singles
 "Wipe Me Down" (with Lil Boosie & Webbie)
 "Not Myself"
 "She Said" (featuring Trey Songz)
 "Bounce" (featuring T-Pain)
 "Coogi Down"

Guest appearances
 "U Got Cake" Webbie feat. Big Head & Foxx off Trill Entertainment's debut compilation album Trill Entertainment Presents: Survival of the Fittest
 "Bout Dat" Webbie feat. Foxx off Trill Entertainment's debut compilation album Trill Entertainment Presents: Survival of the Fittest
 "Leave the Tags On" Big Head feat. Lil Boosie & Foxx off Trill Entertainment's debut compilation album Trill Entertainment Presents: Survival of the Fittest
 "Got Me Bent" Webbie featuring Lil Boosie & Foxx off Trill Entertainment's debut compilation album Trill Entertainment Presents: Survival of the Fittest
 "Adios" Foxx, Lil Boosie, Big Head & Webbie off Trill Entertainment's debut compilation album Trill Entertainment Presents: Survival of the Fittest
 "Fly as an Eagle" Webbie feat. Foxx & Pimp C off Webbie's second album Savage Life 2
 "Loose as a Goose" Lil Boosie feat. Foxx and Mouse off Lil Boosie's third album Superbad: The Return of Boosie Bad Azz
 "Better Believe It Remix" Lil Boosie feat. Yo Gotti, Trae, Bun B & Foxx
 "Devils" Lil Boosie feat. Foxx off Lil Boosie's third album Incarcerated
 "Thugged Out" Lil Boosie feat. Foxx off Lil Boosie's third album Incarcerated
 "Better Not Fight" Lil Boosie feat. Webbie, Lil Trill & Foxx off Lil Boosie's third album Incarcerated

Filmography
Films
 Ghetto Stories: The Movie (2010)
 Don't Work, Don't Eat (2012)

References

External links 
Official Website

African-American male rappers
Living people
Musicians from Baton Rouge, Louisiana
Rappers from Louisiana
1984 births
21st-century American rappers
21st-century American male musicians
21st-century African-American musicians
20th-century African-American people